Lumar (also Romanized as Lūmār; also known as Shahrak Lūmār) is a city in and the capital of Central District, in Sirvan County, Ilam Province, Iran. At the 2006 census, its population was 2,702, in 591 families. The city is populated by Kurds.

References

Cities in Ilam Province
Populated places in Sirvan County
Kurdish settlements in Ilam Province